Ligue 1 is a French professional football league.

Ligue 1 can also refer to:

CAF (Africa)
Algerian Ligue Professionnelle 1, Algeria
Guinea Ligue 1, Guinea
Ligue 1 (Ivory Coast), Ivory Coast
Ligue 1 Mauritania, Mauritania
Niger Ligue 1, Niger
Senegalese Ligue 1, Senegal
Tunisian Ligue Professionnelle 1, Tunisia

OFC (Oceania)
Tahiti Ligue 1, Tahiti

See also 
Ligue 2 (disambiguation)